Nabataean language may refer to:
 Nabataean Aramaic, a Western Aramaic variety that was the written language of the Nabataean kingdom
 Nabataean Arabic, the dialect of Arabic spoken by the Nabataeans
 Eastern Aramaic varieties that were referred to by the Muslim Arabs as "Nabataean"